David Carty, known by his stage name Jelleestone, is a Canadian rapper.

Early life
Originally from the Rexdale neighbourhood in the former city of Etobicoke (now Toronto), Carty spent his childhood living in both Toronto and New York City.

Career
He began performing as a rapper with the local Toronto rap groups PNP and ORB, before contributing the solo track "When You're Hot, You're Hot" to the Rudimental compilation in 1997.

He subsequently recorded his debut album Jelleestone Thirteen, which was produced by Jon Levine of The Philosopher Kings. He was preparing to release the album on his own independent label Rex Entertainment, but began attracting label interest in the United States after Nelly Furtado, who had the same manager, began talking about his work in media interviews. Signed to Warner Bros. Records in 2000, he released Jelleestone Thirteen on the label on August 28, 2001. The album's single, "Money (Part 1)", was a top 40 hit in Canada and reached #75 on Billboards Hot Singles Sales chart.

In 2001 Jelleestone performed in Charlottetown with Kardinal Offishall, IRS and Rascalz.

He garnered two nominations at the Juno Awards of 2002, for Best New Solo Artist and Best Rap Recording.

In June 2003, Carty and his cousin David Gayle were arrested outside The Money nightclub in downtown Toronto, after an altercation in which he was alleged to have threatened another man, during which Gayle was discovered to have a gun hidden in his shoe. Testimony during the trial revealed that the plaintiff, not Carty, had initiated the incident after he felt "brushed off" by Carty, and that Carty had no knowledge of Gayle's gun. Gayle was sentenced to 15 months in jail, while the charges against Carty were dropped.

He won a MuchMusic Video Award for Best Rap Video in 2004 for "Who Dat", a collaboration with Jamaican musician Elephant Man. The track was featured on his second album, The Hood Is Here, released in 2005. The album also featured "Friendamine", a collaboration with Furtado.

In the same year, he also collaborated with Esthero on the song "Fastlane", from her album Wikked Lil' Grrrls.

Discography
Studio albums

 Jelleestone Thirteen (2001)
 The Hood Is Here (2005)
 3rd studio album (TBA)

Singles

 Money (Part 1)
 Makes The World Go 'Round
 Who Dat (ft. Elephant Man)
 The Hood Is Here
 Friendamine (ft. Nelly Furtado)
 I'm With You
 Dim Ur Light

References

Canadian male rappers
Black Canadian musicians
People from Etobicoke
Rappers from Toronto
Living people
21st-century Canadian male musicians
21st-century Canadian rappers
Year of birth missing (living people)